Duke Timothy Akamisoko is a Nigerian Anglican bishop. He is bishop of the Kubwa diocese, in the Abuja province of the Church of Nigeria, a denomination of the worldwide Anglican Communion.

Education and training
Gari primary school, Kaduna
Teachers' College, Dutsin-a, Katsina
Federal College of Education, Katsina
Bishop Crowther College of Theology, Okene
University of Nsukka
Theological College of Northern Nigeria
Bukuru/University of Jos

Career history
ordained deacon June 1991; ordained priest December 1991
canon 1997
archdeacon 2000
bishop 2005
teacher/chaplain at Crowther Memorial College Lokoja 1989-1996
vicar of St Barnabas church, Ecewu, Kogi State 1991-1992
vicar of Memorial church Lokoja 1992-1997
canon residentiary at St Luke's cathedral, Birin, Kebbe State 1997-2001
archdeacon at St Luke's cathedral, Birin, Kebbe State 2001-2002
director of ecumenism and inter-faith dialogue in the Primate's office at the Abuja province
named in January 2005 as bishop of the missionary diocese of Zonkwa in the Abuja province; consecrated 19 March 2005
translated from Zonkwa diocese to Kubwa diocese in 2009, as successor to Bishop Simon Bala who died in November 2008.

"Church and society" comments
Bishop Duke has decried the poor state of the education system in Nigeria.

He has spoken out against terrorism and corruption, urging the Federal Government of Nigeria to adopt methods used by other nations use to counter terrorism, saying "Every step should be taken by the government at all levels, federal, state and the local governments to avert this ugly and embarrassing situation; another serious matter is corruption that infiltrated all levels and areas of government including the civil service".

The bishop advocates a tougher stance on crime, stating "in Nigeria, people steal money and they are not punished". He has advocated capital punishment for offenders found guilty of murder.

Personal life
Bishop Duke married his wife Sarah in 1996 and in 2013 they had twins: a boy and a girl.

Published works
Samuel Ajayi Crowther:  His Missionary Work in the Lokoja Area January 2002.

Bishop Duke has also published academic studies on the dual nature of Jesus Christ and (essays) on the 39 Articles of the Church of England.

References

Living people
21st-century Anglican bishops in Nigeria
Year of birth missing (living people)
Anglican bishops of Zonkwa
Anglican bishops of Kubwa
Church of Nigeria archdeacons
University of Nigeria alumni